2016 Hellmann's 500 was a NASCAR Sprint Cup Series race held on October 23, 2016, at Talladega Superspeedway in Lincoln, Alabama. Contested over 188 laps on the 2.66 mile (4.2 km) superspeedway, it was the 32nd race of the 2016 NASCAR Sprint Cup Series season, sixth race of the Chase and final race of the Round of 12. This was the final race for 2000 Winston Cup champion Bobby Labonte.

Report

Background

Talladega Superspeedway, originally known as Alabama International Motor Superspeedway (AIMS), is a motorsports complex located north of Talladega, Alabama. It is located on the former Anniston Air Force Base in the small city of Lincoln. The track is a tri-oval and was constructed in the 1960s by the International Speedway Corporation, a business controlled by the France Family. Talladega is most known for its steep banking and the unique location of the start/finish line that's located just past the exit to pit road. The track currently hosts the NASCAR series such as the Sprint Cup Series, Xfinity Series and the Camping World Truck Series. Talladega is the longest NASCAR oval with a length of  tri-oval like the Daytona International Speedway, which also is a  tri-oval.

Entry list

Practice

First practice

Final practice

Qualifying

He said afterwards that winning the pole was "definitely cool. You come here, and you don't really have a whole lot to say as a driver when it comes to qualifying, so obviously proud of the team and proud of everybody in Denver (Colorado) and proud of everybody at the race track for their efforts. Built a brand new car to come here, and it's awesome to be the fastest guy in town. Excited about that, and obviously everybody at TRD (Toyota Racing Development) who builds the engines has done a great job too – it takes a lot to get a restrictor plate pole, so excited for all those guys and really neat to lead Toyota to their 1,000th start (in NASCAR’s top three series combined). Hopefully, we'll be able to get the victory when the day is over."

Qualifying results

Race

First half
Under clear blue Alabama skies, Martin Truex Jr. led the field to the green flag at 2:22 p.m. Brad Keselowski got a run on him going down the backstretch to lead the first lap. He led the first 12 before Truex got alongside him in turn 1 to take the lead on lap 13, only to give it back to him a lap later. Keselowski spent much of the run blocking all three lanes while controlling the lead. Doing so allowed Chase Elliott to move under him in turn 3 and take the lead on lap 26. Keselowski regained it briefly on lap 28 before Elliott powered by on the top in turn 1 to take the lead back on lap 29. Keselowski drove under him in the tri-oval to retake the lead on lap 32. A wave of cars hit pit road to start the first round of green flag stops on lap 37. Keselowski joined the next wave the following lap and handed the lead to Denny Hamlin. He pitted on lap 39 and handed the lead to Matt Kenseth. He pitted on lap 40 and handed the lead to Kyle Busch. After he pitted the following lap, the lead cycled back to Keselowski. A. J. Allmendinger and Hamlin were assessed pass through penalties for speeding, and Joey Logano was assessed a stop and go penalty for removing equipment (pit jack) from his pit box. “Nice to know we have the world record for the fastest jack,” joked Logano afterwards.

Truex brought out the first caution of the race on lap 41 after his engine blew up in turn 2. He said afterwards that the car "developed a vibration and started to lose a little bit of power. Originally I thought it could have been a tire because it was shaking worse and worse and worse until it was time to pit. I slowed down to hit pit road and felt the vibration still there and knew it was the engine." He added that it stung "to go out like that. We could have raced all day, gotten in a big wreck and still not made it … but it sure would have been nice to at least find out, at least play the whole game, so to speak, and see what happened. To barely make it to the first pit stop stinks.” He went on to finish 40th.

The race restarted on lap 47. Keselowski led most of the run as he did the first by blocking all three lanes from advancing past him. Attempting to block Elliott's advance, Keselowski found himself without drafting help and Elliott took the lead on lap 62. Greg Biffle got a run on him going into turn 1 to take the lead the following lap. Elliott dropped to the bottom going into turn 1 and retook the lead on lap 76. Cars started pitting under green on lap 79. Elliott pitted the following lap and handed the lead to Hamlin. He pitted on lap 81 and handed the lead to Carl Edwards. He pitted on lap 82 and handed the lead to Michael Annett. When Annett pitted on lap 88, the lead cycled back to Keselowski.

Second half

After the round of stops, Keselowski led from lap 89 to 109. Ryan Blaney took the lead for a circuit on lap 110 and Hamlin moved back to the front on lap 111. A three-car wreck on the frontstretch involving Biffle, Jeffrey Earnhardt and Casey Mears brought out the second caution with 74 laps to go.

The race restarted with 68 to go. Keselowski moved back to the lead with 66 to go and held it until a piece of debris found itself lodged on the grille of his car with less than 50 laps remaining. With 44 to go, he let Blaney slid in front of him and assume the lead so that he could use the pocket of air to clean the trash off his grille (a common practice in NASCAR races, particularly at Daytona and Talladega). The plan worked and the debris flew off his grille, but his engine went up in smoke on the backstretch and brought out the third caution with 42 to go. He said afterwards that he's "not an engine guy, but the car was really strong and we definitely kept finding debris. I thought I got it cooled off and only got it slightly over, but I don't know. ... That's racing. We just had a tremendous race going, but it wasn't meant to be." After a round of pit stops, Logano assumed the race lead.

The race restarted with 39 to go and the caution flew for the fourth time for a corner panel laying on the backstretch before the field had completed the lap.

The race restarted with 35 to go. There were a few challenges to Logano for the lead, but nobody could get the lead from him. A three-car incident in turn 3 involving Trevor Bayne, Kasey Kahne and Jamie McMurray brought out the fifth caution with five to go.

The race restarted with three to go. As the field was coming to the line to get two laps to go, Alex Bowman spinning through the tri-oval brought out the sixth caution and forced overtime.

Overtime
Past the scheduled distance of 188 laps, the race restarted on lap 190 with two laps to go. Logano drove on to score the victory.

Post-race

Driver comments
Logano said in victory lane that Talladega is "never a layup...It's always close. You never get a big lead. (Crew chief) Todd (Gordon) made some good adjustments during the race and found some speed in the car, so that was pretty neat to see some of that. We got that track position and just hung onto it. I was able to stay on the bottom and try to run the bottom and keep everyone in line, and that worked out really well."

Brian Scott, who earned a career-best runner-up finish, said that "a good finish always helps. It helps with the team. It helps with the guys at the shop, the morale. Just trying to get any bit of a bright spot in this year has been difficult. I think that this is by far the brightest spot that we’ve had in a really challenging 2016 for Richard Petty Motorsports. I don't know, I guess the results and what this does for us going forward is yet to be determined. But just proud. I mean, the guys have worked hard all year. They've deserved a lot better finishes than we’ve given them. Just proud to deliver a good, solid top five, to do my job behind the wheel to give us a shot at the win, just have a good day for Richard Petty Motorsports."

Hamlin, by a margin of six one-thousandths of a second (.006), beat Kurt Busch for third and advanced onto the Round of 8 over Austin Dillon via a tiebreaker. He said after the race that his team "needed some things to fall our way if we didn't win the race. Today things fell our way...But for me I really truly believe this is the first great fortune that we had in a Chase in my 11-year career. Things just happened well for us. We went out there and we did our jobs.”

Busch said his race "was really fun. Every time I would make a mistake and get shuffled to the middle it seemed like the crew guys would bring back a solid pit stop to put us in position and to be in control,” Busch said. “It feels good when we have that plus alongside our name in points. I was trying to ease it for Tony Gibson (crew chief) and all these guys that work so hard. There was some rooting and gouging at the end and I got some damage. I don’t even know where we finished, but all I was shooting for was top 15.” After the race, it appeared that Kevin Harvick came up to his car and punched him as a result of a misunderstanding. Busch told NBCSN that Harvick "has a misunderstanding of the call at the end of the race. He'll understand it and I'm sure he'll clear it up in his interview. For us, we're great teammates, we're doing good together and we have to work together to beat all these other teams out there. And he knows that."

Dillon, who missed moving onto the Round of 8 on a tiebreaker with Hamlin despite finishing ninth, said he "just couldn't get another spot. We got a couple there at the end, on the last little straight, but (Aric Almirola) was the car we needed and didn't work out. I knew we needed to be in the top 10 because Denny was up front. I was just trying to get as many spots as I could. I was forcing myself in places that probably really weren't there but made it work. Needed a little bit more speed today and little bit more help if we could. But we tried.”

Race results

Race summary
 Lead changes: 14 among different drivers
 Cautions/Laps: 6 for 25
 Red flags: 0
 Time of race: 3 hours, 11 minutes and 38 seconds
 Average speed:

Media

Television
NBCSN will cover the race on the television side. Rick Allen, Jeff Burton and Steve Letarte will call in the booth for the race with a Guest Appearance by Dale Earnhardt Jr. Dave Burns, Mike Massaro, Marty Snider and Kelli Stavast will handle pit road on the television side.

Radio
MRN will cover the radio call for the race, which was simulcast on Sirius XM NASCAR Radio.

Standings after the race

Drivers' Championship standings

Manufacturers' Championship standings

Note: Only the first 16 positions are included for the driver standings.

References

2016 in sports in Alabama
2016 NASCAR Sprint Cup Series
NASCAR races at Talladega Superspeedway
October 2016 sports events in the United States